Generation Park  is a neomodern office constructed by real estate developer Skanska in Warsaw, Poland, designed by JEMS Architekci.

The tower is accompanied by two lower buildings.

References

Skyscraper office buildings in Warsaw